Systems command may refer to:
United States Navy systems commands, development agencies of the United States Navy.
Space Systems Command, the future acquisition, research and development, and launch command of the United States Space Force.
Air Force Systems Command, the former research and development command of the United States Air Force.